The parable of the arrow (or 'Parable of the poisoned arrow') is a Buddhist parable that illustrates the skeptic and pragmatic themes of the Cūḷamālukya Sutta (The Shorter Instructions to Mālukya) which is part of the middle length discourses (Majjhima Nikaya), one of the five sections of the Sutta Pitaka. The Pāli text contains a number of hapax legomena or otherwise obscure archery terms and these are generally poorly dealt with in English translations.

Narrative
The sutta begins at Jetavana where the monk Malunkyaputta is troubled by Gautama Buddha's silence on the fourteen unanswerable questions, which include queries about the nature of the cosmos and life after the death of a Buddha. Malunkyaputta then meets with Gautama Buddha and asks him for the answers to these questions, he says that if he fails to respond, Malunkya will renounce his teachings. Gautama responds by first stating that he never promised to reveal ultimate metaphysical truths such as those and then uses the story of a man who has been shot with a poisoned arrow to illustrate that those questions are irrelevant to his teachings.

Commentary

Thích Nhất Hạnh comments on the way the parable of the poisoned arrow illustrates Gautama Buddha's anti-metaphysical views:

 

Sangharakshita notes that "The important thing is to get rid of the arrow, not to enquire where it came from."

The parable is considered a teaching on being practical and dealing with the situation at hand.

Chinese sources
The story is also preserved in two Chinese translations of Prakrit sources. 
 箭喻經 Jiàn yù jīng (Arrow Metaphor Sūtra), T 1.26 (p0804a21), （二二一）中阿含例品 (Èr èr yī) Zhōng ā hán, Lì pǐn. Madhyāgama 221, Chapter on Examples. Translated from an Indic language (possibly Gāndārī) into Chinese by a Sarvāstivāda Tripiṭaka master, Gautama Saṅghadeva, from Kashmir in the Eastern Jin Dynasty ca. Dec 397 – Jan 398 CE. 
 佛說箭喻經 Fú shuō jiàn yù jīng

Each of these uses different translation strategies. T 1.26 transposes the various archery terms into items and materials familiar to a Chinese audience; while T 1.94 uses transliterated Indic terms that do not match the Pāli in most cases. Thus the obscure Pāli terms remain largely obscure for now. A third Chinese text, Mahāprajñāpāramitāupadeśa (T 1509 at T XXV 170a8-b1) contains a paraphrase of this text.

References

External links
Parable at Buddhanet

Majjhima Nikaya
Parables
Buddhist philosophy
Theravada Buddhist texts
Pali Buddhist texts